The 2022 T1 League playoffs was the postseason tournament of the T1 League's 2021–22 season. The play-in series was played on May 22. The semifinals series started on May 24 and ended on May 28. The finals series started on May 31 and ended on June 4. On June 4, the Kaohsiung Aquas defeated the Taichung Wagor Suns, 3–0, winning the 2021–22 season championship.

Format 
Five teams will participate in the playoffs. The top three teams, based on winning percentage of regular season, directly qualify for the semifinals. The fourth and fifth seeds play the best-of-three play-in series, which is in a 1-1 format. The fourth seed will be awarded a one-win advantage. The winner of play-in series and the top three seeds play the best-of-five semifinals series. The winners of the semifinals series play the best-of-seven finals series. The semifinals series change to best-of-three series, which is in a 1-1-1 format. And finals series change to best-of-five series, which is in a 2-2-1 format, due to the COVID-19 pandemic in Taiwan.

Playoff qualifying 
On April 17, 2022, the Kaohsiung Aquas clinched the regular season title. On May 18, the Taoyuan Leopards became the first team to qualify the play-in series. On May 19, the New Taipei CTBC DEA became the final team to secure a direct berth in the semifinals bracket, qualifying as the third seed and relegating the TaiwanBeer HeroBears to the play-in series. On May 22, the TaiwanBeer HeroBears won the play-in series and advance to the semifinals bracket.

Bracket 

Bold Series winner
Italic Team with home-court advantage

Play-in: (4) TaiwanBeer HeroBears vs. (5) Taoyuan Leopards

Semifinals

(1) Kaohsiung Aquas vs. (4) TaiwanBeer HeroBears

(2) Taichung Wagor Suns vs. (3) New Taipei CTBC DEA

T1 League Finals: (1) Kaohsiung Aquas vs. (2) Taichung Wagor Suns

References

External links 

Playoffs
T1 League playoffs
Basketball events curtailed due to the COVID-19 pandemic
2022 in Taiwanese sport
T1 League
T1 League